The Open Era is the current era of professional tennis. It began in 1968 when the Grand Slam tournaments allowed professional players to compete with amateurs, ending the division that had persisted since the dawn of the sport in the 19th century. The first open tournament was the 1968 British Hard Court Championships held in April, followed by the inaugural open Grand Slam tournament, the 1968 French Open, a month later. Unless otherwise sourced, all records are based on data from the Association of Tennis Professionals (ATP), the International Tennis Federation (ITF), and the official websites of the four Grand Slam tournaments. All rankings-related records are based on ATP rankings, which began in 1973. The names of active players appear in boldface.

Grand Slam tournaments

Career totals 
Updated as of 2023 Australian Open. Where there are multiple entries for the same record, entrants are ranked on the basis of who achieved the record in chronological order.

Matches

Grand Slam achievements

Calendar Year Grand Slam

Non-Calendar Year Grand Slam

Career Grand Slam

At each Grand Slam tournament totals

Season totals

Most seasons with at least one major title or one final

Per Grand Slam tournament totals

Titles per tournament

Finals per tournament

Match record per tournament 
 minimum 20 wins (correct as of 2023 Australian Open).

Match wins per tournament

Events won with no sets dropped 

 Most sets dropped en route to the title were 8: Borg in 1974, Becker in 1985 and Kuerten in 1997.

Consecutive totals 
▲ indicates an active streak

Spanning consecutive tournaments

Spanning non-consecutive tournaments

Consecutive titles per tournament

Consecutive match wins per tournament

Court type totals

Match record 
 minimum 30 wins (correct as of 2023 Australian Open).

Match wins

Year-end championships 
There have been three prominent Year-end Championships in the Open Era, each involving only the top performers for the given year. Those championships have been the most coveted titles after the four Grand Slams during the Open Era.
(1970–present) This is a combination of the YECs for two separate tours: the ITF Grand Prix that ran until 1989 and the ATP Tour that replaced it. For record-keeping purposes, the ATP has incorporated the entire history of the ITF "Masters Grand Prix" alongside its ATP Finals tournament; thus they are both listed as "ATP" here. In total, these YECs have been held at numerous venues around the globe and played on several surfaces (indoor hard since 2006).
(1971–89) The WCT Finals, as the YEC for the World Championship Tennis tour, was held in Dallas, Texas and played on indoor carpet courts.
(1990–99) The Grand Slam Cup (GSC) was an ITF tournament for the top performers in the year's Grand Slam tournaments. It was held in Munich, Germany and played on indoor carpet courts.

Boris Becker was the only player to have won all three Championships.
 WCT and GSC tournaments are specifically indicated in the Overall titles table.

Overall totals 
Correct as of 21 November 2022.

ATP totals

WCT totals

Masters tournaments 

(1970–1989)
Before the ATP took control of the men's professional tour in 1990, the Grand Prix Super Series was the highest class of events after the Grand Slams and the Year-end Championships but unlike the Masters series, the participation of the top players was not mandatory.

(1990–present)
The Masters is an annual series of nine top-level tournaments featuring the top professional men players. The Masters events along with the Grand Slam tournaments and Year-end Championships constitute the most coveted titles on the annual ATP Tour calendar.

ATP Tour totals 
Correct as of 2023 Indian Wells Masters.

Career Golden Masters

All tournaments

Career totals 
Match stats correct (as of 2023 Indian Wells Masters).

Titles & finals

Matches

vs. Top 10

Season totals

Tournament totals 
 Grand Slam tournaments in bold.

Winning streaks 
▲ indicates an active streak

Winning streaks per court type

Court type totals

Titles

Match record

Match wins

Titles per season

Per consecutive seasons

Big Titles 

The Grand Slam tournaments, the Masters events and the ATP Finals are the Big Titles of the annual ATP Tour calendar since 1990, in addition to the Olympics. Between 1970 and 1989, the biggest titles were the four majors and the Year-end Championships (ATP Finals, WCT Finals and Grand Slam Cup), in addition to the Grand Prix Super Series events.

 Active players and records in bold.

Olympic tournaments 

Tennis was reinstated as an official Olympic sport in 1988. There have been nine tournaments in the Open Era.

ATP rankings achievements 

ATP rankings began in 1973. These weekly rankings determine tournament eligibility and seedings. At the end of each year they also become the official ATP season rankings.

Rankings weeks 
 The ATP Tour was suspended from 16 March to 21 August 2020. The ATP ranking was frozen from 23 March to 23 August 2020.
Correct  with (▲) indicating active streaks.

Consecutive weeks

Year-end rankings 

Consecutive years

Prize money 
Prize money has increased throughout the open era, in some cases greatly in a short time span. For example, the Australian Open winner received A$916,000 in 2004 and will receive A$2,975,000 in 2023.
 Career totals include doubles prize money and are not inflation-adjusted.

Miscellaneous

Youngest and oldest

Grand Slams

No. 1 & Top 10

Win percentage 
 minimum 25 matches (M/Y is average number of matches per year during the streak)

Consecutive

Sets statistics

Set and game winning percentages 

Correct as of 2023 Australian Open.

Consecutive sets won 

Consecutive sets won per court type

See also 

 All-time tennis records – Men's singles
 ATP Finals appearances
 ATP Tour records
 List of ATP number 1 ranked singles tennis players
 List of ATP Tour top-level tournament singles champions
 List of Grand Slam men's singles champions
 Lists of tennis records and statistics
 Open Era tennis records – Women's singles
 Tennis Masters Series singles records and statistics

Notes

References 

Tennis records and statistics